The women's 200 metre breaststroke event, included in the swimming competition at the 1980 Summer Olympics, took place on July 23, at the Swimming Pool at the Olimpiysky Sports Complex in Moscow, Soviet Union. In this event, swimmers covered four lengths of the 50-metre (160 ft) Olympic-sized pool employing the breaststroke. It was the thirteenth appearance of the event, which first appeared at the 1924 Summer Olympics in Paris. A total of 25 competitors from 18 nations participated in the event.

Records
Prior to this competition, the existing world and Olympic records were:

The following records were established during the competition:

Results

Heats

Final

Sources

References

B
1980 in women's swimming
Women's events at the 1980 Summer Olympics